A. Ross Boggs, Jr. is a former Democratic member of the Ohio House of Representatives, who served as minority leader. He is the brother of former state Representative and state Senator Robert Boggs. He is also the uncle of current state representative Kristin Boggs, she currently serves as Assistant Minority Leader for the Democratic Caucus.

References

Democratic Party members of the Ohio House of Representatives
Living people
Year of birth missing (living people)